daviswiki.org is a wiki based in Davis, California about the people, events, universities, bands, places and other things of the city.  For example, it includes information about local events, advice for classes to take or not take at UC Davis, locations of the cleanest bathrooms in town, and ways a poor student can best pack a to-go box from the local restaurant buffets. Newcomers or anyone with a question about life in Davis are often asked by "wikivangelists", "Did you check the wiki?", much in the spirit of RTFM. It was launched in June 2004.

Size and activity
DavisWiki was at one point the largest City Wiki in the world. Karlsruhe's city wiki Stadtwiki Karlsruhe has since surpassed DavisWiki in total page count, but differences in the wiki software, varying content/page densities, make drawing conclusions from page counts problematic. As of November 2009 DavisWiki has over 14,945 pages, 11134 registered editors, 301 editors who have made over 100 edits, and 35 editors who have made over 1000 edits.

In June 2010, DavisWiki claimed: "On a given day, about 1 in 6 residents visits the site. Over the course of one week, nearly half of the residents. And over a month, we have found that just about every Davisite visits the wiki. ... 1 in 7 residents actually contribute their own knowledge to the wiki."

Community involvement
Based on the above activity, and the interest that local politics have on daviswiki, the Davis Human Relations Commission awarded the daviswiki the Thong Hy Huynh Award for Excellence in Community Involvement.

Viewpoint
Davis Wiki includes long discussions on its pages regarding local politics, local elections, development, city policies and similar material. This is a bit counter to many wikis, which strive for a neutral point of view in all articles. Articles on the Davis Wiki are balanced by consolidating commentary to present an aggregate set of multiple points-of-view, intending to reflect the actual Davis community.

Funding
DavisWiki is part of the LocalWiki project and is financed by the LocalWiki charitable 501(c)3 organization.
They are run advertisement-free through community donations and fundraising events.

LocalWiki
Some of the Davis Wiki team, including co-founders Philip Neustrom and Mike Ivanov, were working on the LocalWiki project.
  The LocalWiki project aims to be an ideal platform for sharing local community information.

See also
Comparison of wiki farms
Comparison of wiki software
List of wiki software
List of wikis

References

External links
Davis Wiki
LocalWiki

Citizen mass media in California
Davis, California
Internet properties established in 2004
Wikis